The men's 3000 metres event at the 1967 European Indoor Games was held on 12 March in Prague.

Results

References

3000 metres at the European Athletics Indoor Championships
3000